Sandu District is one of the four districts of the Upper River Division of the Republic of the Gambia. It contains the town of Diabugu.

References

Upper River Division
Districts of the Gambia